The Duet free routine competition of the 2022 European Aquatics Championships was held on 12 and 13 August 2022.

Results
The preliminary round was held on 12 August at 09:30. The final round was held on 13 August at 15:00.

References

Artistic